HMS Chamois was a Palmer three-funnel, 30-knot destroyer ordered by the Royal Navy under the 1895–1896 Naval Estimates.  She was the first ship of the Royal Navy to carry this name. She was commissioned in 1897 and served in both the Channel and the Mediterranean. She foundered in 1904 after her own propeller pierced her hull.

Construction
She was laid down on 28 May 1896 as yard number 713 at the Palmer shipyard at Jarrow-on-Tyne and launched on 9 November 1896.  During her builder's trials she met her contracted speed requirement. Chamois was completed and accepted by the Royal Navy in November 1897.

Service
Chamois returned to Portsmouth with her shaft bent in early 1900. She was commissioned for service in the Channel Fleet on 15 March 1900, but he and the crew transferred to HMS Sylvia only days later as the Chamois needed further repairs. She was later deployed as a tender to the destroyer depot ship  at Malta. In September 1902 she visited Nauplia and Souda Bay with other ships of the fleet.

Loss
On 26 September 1904, she was the victim of a bizarre accident. While conducting a full-power trial in the Gulf of Patras off the Greek coast she lost a propeller blade. The loss of the blade unbalanced the shaft, which was spinning at high speed. The resulting vibration broke the shaft bracket and tore a large hole in the hull. All hands were saved, but two men were injured with one of them dying the following day.

References

Bibliography

External links
 YouTube - diving the wreck of HMS Chamois

 

Ships built on the River Tyne
1896 ships
C-class destroyers (1913)
Maritime incidents in 1904
Shipwrecks in the Mediterranean Sea